The Assisi Underground is a 1985 American film made for television, written and directed by Alexander Ramati. It is an adaptation of his 1978 novel,  The Assisi Underground:  The Priest who Rescued Jews, which is based on a true-life account  by Father Rufino Niccacci of events surrounding the Assisi Network, an effort to hide 300 Jews in the town of Assisi, Italy during World War II. The film stars Ben Cross, Irene Papas, Maximilian Schell, Karlheinz Hackl, and James Mason in his final performance  before his death in July 1984. His final role in a feature film was The Shooting Party.

Plot
In 1943 Franciscan priest Rufino Niccacci is asked by the bishop of Assisi Giuseppe Placido Nicolini to covertly rescue Italian Jews from the Nazis.

Cast
 Ben Cross as Rufino Niccacci 
 James Mason as Monsignor Giuseppe Placido Nicolini, Bishop of Assisi  
 Irene Papas as Mother Giuseppina 
 Maximilian Schell  as Colonel Valentin Müller
 Karlheinz Hackl as  Captain von Velden       
 Geoffrey Copleston as Chief of Police Bertolucci   
 Riccardo Cucciolla  as Luigi Brizi   
 Angelo Infanti as Giorgio Kropf 
 Delia Boccardo as  Countess Cristina 
 Paolo Malco as Paolo Josza 
 Roberto Bisacco as Professor Rieti
 Edmund Purdom as Cardinal Elia Dalla Costa
 Venantino Venantini as Pietro
 Maurice Poli as Vito 
 Giancarlo Prete as Col. Gay 
 Alessandra Mussolini as  Sister Beata
 Riccardo Salvino as Otto Maionica
 Greta Vayan as Rita Maionica
 Alfredo Pea as Gino Bartali

Critical response
The film received a poor response from critics.

History
In 1998,  The New York Times published an article about an Assisi resident who had come there as a refugee.

On October 5, 2012, The National Catholic Register published a long two-part article pegged to the opening of a new exhibition based on 25 years of research into the city's role in saving thousands of refugees, including approximately 300 Jews.

References

1985 films
1985 drama films
Films directed by Alexander Ramati
American drama films
American World War II films
Holocaust films
Films based on Polish novels
Films set in 1943
Films set in Italy
World War II films based on actual events
Films about Catholicism
Golan-Globus films
Films produced by Menahem Golan
Films produced by Yoram Globus
1980s English-language films
1980s American films